World History Encyclopedia (formerly Ancient History Encyclopedia) is a nonprofit educational company created in 2009 by Jan van der Crabben. The organization publishes and maintains articles, images, videos, podcasts, and interactive educational tools related to history. All users may contribute content to the site, although submissions are reviewed by an editorial team before publication. In 2021, the organization was renamed from the Ancient History Encyclopedia to World History Encyclopedia to reflect its broadened scope, covering world history from all time periods, as opposed to just ancient history. Original articles are written in English and later translated into other languages, mainly French and Spanish.

Organization history
The Ancient History Encyclopedia was founded in 2009 by van der Crabben with the stated goal of improving history education worldwide by creating a freely accessible and reliable history source. The nonprofit organization is based in Godalming, United Kingdom and Montreal, Canada, although it has no office and its team is globally distributed.

The site had an emphasis on ancient history when it was founded, but it later shifted to cover the Medieval and early Modern periods as well. In 2021, the organization renamed itself World History Encyclopedia to reflect this change.

Reception 
The website has received praise by educational organizations and has been recommended by the School Library Journal, the Internet Scout Research Group at the University of Wisconsin–Madison, MERLOT, and the European Commission's Open Education Europa initiative. In 2016, it won the .eu Web Award for education from the organization EURid.

References

External links 
 

British online encyclopedias
Education companies of the United Kingdom
Educational technology non-profits
History websites of the United Kingdom
Horsham
Internet properties established in 2009
Online encyclopedias
Online nonprofit organizations
Open educational resources
Organizations established in 2009
Remote companies